Katamari Forever, known in Japan as , is a video game in the Katamari series. The game was released for the PlayStation 3 console in Japan on July 23, 2009, on September 22, 2009 in North America, and September 18, 2009 in Europe. A demo of the game became available on the Japanese PlayStation Network on its Japanese release date, and on the North American PlayStation Network on September 10, 2009.

Story and gameplay
Katamari Forever contains 34 stages, with all but three of the stages being taken from previous titles in the series. Half of the stages take place within the mind of the King of All Cosmos, who gets knocked in the head and suffers from amnesia. The levels are black-and-white in appearance, and the objective is to roll up junk to bring color back to the stages, restoring the King's memory. The other half of the stages take place in the present, where RoboKing, a robotic version of the King of All Cosmos created by the Prince and his cousins, goes on a rampage and destroys all the stars in the sky, which, unlike the King, he feels extremely remorseful for.

The objective of the new levels involves creating stars by rolling up junk as in previous Katamari Damacy games. New additions to the gameplay include: the "Prince Hop", which allows the Prince to hop into the air by flicking the controller up or pressing a shoulder button; and the "King Shock", which sucks nearby objects onto the katamari like a magnet.

Katamari Forever lacks the online multiplayer mode as in Beautiful Katamari, but does include local multiplayer and online leaderboards. The game utilizes a full high-definition video format. In addition to graphics in the original style of Katamari Damacy, the game allows the players to select graphic filters such as cel-shaded, colored pencil, or wood grain graphics.

Music
The music for the game includes a number of remixed tracks from previous iterations of the series, using a combination of "electric" and "organic" sounds according to the sound director Yuu Miyake. Miyake employed the help of artists and remixers to help the soundtrack. The soundtrack was released in Japan on August 19, 2009. It includes a total of 36 tracks spanning two discs.

Reception

Katamari Forever was met with positive to average reception upon release.  GameRankings gave it a score of 77.80%, while Metacritic gave it 74 out of 100.

The game received a score of 33 out of 40 by Japanese gaming publication Famitsu. It was the 6th best-selling game in Japan during the week of its release, selling 28,000 units. In America, IGN awarded the game 7 out of 10, noting that the game still suffered from many of the issues that plagued past entries in the series. GameSpot also gave it 7 out of 10, stating that, "Rolling a katamari is as charming as ever, but you may have rolled most of these katamaris before." PixlBit awarded the game 4 of 5 stars recommending the game to both fans of the series and newcomers alike.

References

External links
Official website 
Official Japanese trailer

2009 video games
Katamari
PlayStation 3 games
PlayStation 3-only games
Video games with cel-shaded animation
Genki (company) games
Bandai Namco games
Puzzle video games
Multiplayer and single-player video games
Video games developed in Japan
Video games scored by Yuu Miyake